The Saint-Louis Region of Senegal is on the border with Mauritania. Its capital is Saint-Louis.

Famous for the cast iron bridge in its capital, built by French colonialists in the 19th century, the region includes the Djoudj National Bird Sanctuary, home to thousands of birds, some indigenous to the area.

Départements
Saint-Louis region is divided into 3 départements:
Dagana Département
Podor Département
Saint-Louis Département

Geography
Saint-Louis is traversed by the northwesterly line of equal latitude and longitude.

See also
Lac de Guiers

References

 
Regions of Senegal